The 1974–75 NCAA Division I men's ice hockey season began in October 1974 and concluded with the 1975 NCAA Division I Men's Ice Hockey Tournament's championship game on March 15, 1975, at the St. Louis Arena in St. Louis, Missouri. This was the 28th season in which an NCAA ice hockey championship was held and is the 81st year overall where an NCAA school fielded a team.

Regular season

Season tournaments

Standings

1975 NCAA Tournament

Note: * denotes overtime period(s)

Player stats

Scoring leaders
The following players led the league in points at the conclusion of the season.

GP = Games played; G = Goals; A = Assists; Pts = Points; PIM = Penalty minutes

Leading goaltenders
The following goaltenders led the league in goals against average at the end of the regular season while playing at least 33% of their team's total minutes.

GP = Games played; Min = Minutes played; W = Wins; L = Losses; OT = Overtime/shootout losses; GA = Goals against; SO = Shutouts; SV% = Save percentage; GAA = Goals against average

Awards

NCAA

CCHA

ECAC

WCHA

See also
 1974–75 NCAA Division II men's ice hockey season
 1974–75 NCAA Division III men's ice hockey season

References

External links
College Hockey Historical Archives
1974–75 NCAA Standings

 
NCAA